Robert Lucian Scarlett (born 23 May 1943) is a former Jamaican cricketer who played four first-class matches for Jamaica in the 1963-64 season.

A slow left-arm orthodox spin bowler and lower-order batsman, Bob Scarlett's best figures were 5 for 95 against Barbados in his third match.

Scarlett's elder brother Reg played Test cricket for West Indies in the 1959-60 season.

References

External links 
 
 Bob Scarlett at Cricket Archive

1943 births
Living people
People from Saint Mary Parish, Jamaica
Jamaican cricketers
Jamaica cricketers